Harry Perry (7 March 1895–28 February 1961) was an English first-class cricketer who played five games for Worcestershire in the late 1920s.

His highest score was the 40 he made against Yorkshire in his second match,
while his single first-class wicket came in his last innings, when with the final ball of his career he dismissed Hampshire's John Parker.

Notes

References
Harry Perry from CricketArchive

English cricketers
Worcestershire cricketers
1895 births
1961 deaths